Aghajeri may refer to:
 Aghajeri, East Azerbaijan
 Aghajeri, Kurdistan